The 2018 Czech Republic motorcycle Grand Prix was the tenth round of the 2018 MotoGP season. It was held at the Masaryk Circuit in Brno on 5 August 2018. Fabio Di Giannantonio took his first career victory in the Moto3 race.

Classification

MotoGP

 Pol Espargaró suffered a broken collarbone in a crash during Sunday warm-up session and was declared unfit to start the race.

Moto2

Moto3

 Jorge Martín suffered a broken hand in a crash during practice and withdrew from the event.

Championship standings after the race

MotoGP

Moto2

Moto3

References

Czech
Motorcycle Grand Prix
Czech Republic motorcycle Grand Prix
Czech Republic motorcycle Grand Prix